Attinella dorsata is a species of spider from the family Salticidae.

Description
The spider is brown coloured, and is 1/4 of an inch in size.

References

Sitticini
Spiders of the United States
Spiders described in 1895